A statue of Oliver Cromwell stands on Market Hill in St Ives, Cambridgeshire, England. It is a sculpture of Oliver Cromwell, Lord Protector of the Commonwealth of England, Scotland and Ireland. The statue was designed by F. W. Pomeroy and erected in 1901. The statue is one of five public statues of Cromwell in the United Kingdom and is Grade II listed for its architectural merit.

Description and history
The statue was sculpted by F. W. Pomeroy, and features Cromwell standing and pointing. The statue is approached by three steps of Aberdeen granite, with ornamental lamps on each corner.

The location of the statue in the market place in St Ives had been proposed by the historian Thomas Carlyle in an 1849 letter. Carlyle wrote to I.K. Holland that:

In 1899 the nearby town of Huntingdon abandoned their plan to erect a statue to Cromwell, and the opportunity was seized by St Ives. F. W. Pomeroy was commissioned as the sculptor, and the statue was exhibited at the Royal Academy of Arts in London to good reviews. It is the only statue of Cromwell in England that was funded by public donations. The statue has been described as the "...second most visited and photographed monument" in St Ives after the town's bridge chapel on the St Ives Bridge dedicated to St Ledger. The statue was unveiled on 23 October 1901 by the Liberal politician Lord Edmond Fitzmaurice.

See also
Statue of Oliver Cromwell, Warrington
Statue of Oliver Cromwell, Westminster

References

External links

1901 establishments in England
1901 sculptures
Bronze sculptures in the United Kingdom
Oliver Cromwell
Outdoor sculptures in England
Cromwell, Oliver
Cromwell, Oliver, St Ives
Grade II listed buildings in Cambridgeshire
Monuments and memorials in Cambridgeshire
St Ives, Cambridgeshire
Books in art